The 1938 New Mexico Lobos football team represented the University of New Mexico as a member of the Border Conference during the 1938 college football season. In their second season under head coach Ted Shipkey, the Lobos compiled an overall record of 8–3 record with a mark of 4–2 against conference opponents, shared  the Border Conference championship with New Mexico A&M, lost to Utah in the 1939 Sun Bowl, and outscored all opponents by a total of 199 to 72.

Schedule

References

New Mexico
New Mexico Lobos football seasons
Border Conference football champion seasons
New Mexico Lobos football